A freshman is a first-year student.

Freshman or Freshmen (or The Freshman or The Freshmen) may also refer to:

Film and television
The Freshman (1925 film),  a Harold Lloyd film
The Freshman (1990 film), a film starring Marlon Brando and Matthew Broderick
"The Freshman" (Buffy the Vampire Slayer)
"The Freshmen", a Gossip Girl episode
The Freshman (Première année), a 2018 French film directed by Thomas Lilti

Music
Freshman Guitars, a Scottish guitar company launched in 2002
The Freshmen (band), an Irish showband
Freshmen (album), by Nesian Mystik
"The Freshmen" (song), by The Verve Pipe
The Freshmen, a music discussion program on MTVu

Print
Freshmen (comics)
Freshmen (magazine)

See also
The Four Freshmen